Julian Portugal (born August 26, 1992) is a professional Mexican-Spanish footballer who plays as a midfielder.

Career

Early career
Portugal played college soccer at the University of Nevada-Las Vegas between 2011 and 2014.

Portugal also appeared for USL PDL club Las Vegas Mobsters in 2014.

Professional
Portugal signed with United Soccer League club Tulsa Roughnecks in March 2015.

On 2018 January 8, Portugal became one of the first five players signed by USL expansion club Las Vegas Lights FC.

Coaching
Portugal returned to Las Vegas Lights in January 2023 to serve as the club's performance coach.

References

External links 
 Tulsa Roughnecks profile

1992 births
Living people
Mexican expatriate footballers
Mexican footballers
UNLV Rebels men's soccer players
Las Vegas Mobsters players
FC Tulsa players
Las Vegas Lights FC players
Association football midfielders
Footballers from Mexico City
Expatriate soccer players in the United States
USL League Two players
USL Championship players
Soccer players from Nevada
Las Vegas Lights FC coaches
USL Championship coaches
College men's soccer coaches in the United States
High school soccer coaches in the United States